Baccaurea motleyana is a species of fruit tree which grows wild in parts of Southeast Asia and is cultivated for its fruit in Bangladesh, Indonesia, Thailand and Peninsular Malaysia. Its common names include rambai and rambi, and in Thai language mafai-farang. The evergreen leaves are shiny green on the upper surface and greenish-brown and hairy underneath. The species is dioecious, with male and female flowers growing on separate individuals. Both types of flowers are fragrant and have yellow sepals. Each fruit has velvety pinkish, yellow, or brown skin which wrinkles at ripening and is filled with whitish pulp containing 3 to 5 seeds. The pulp is sweet to acid in taste. They may be eaten raw or cooked or made into jam or wine. The tree is also used for shade and low-quality wood.

The specific name is for James Motley who collected it in southeast Borneo prior to his murder.

Gallery

References

External links

Purdue New Crops Profile
FAO Ecocrops Profile
Baccaurea motleyana

motleyana
Fruits originating in Asia